Ellisellidae is a family of soft corals.

Genera
The following genera are recognized within the family Ellisellidae:

 Ctenocella Valenciennes, 1855
 Dichotella Gray, 1870
 Ellisella Gray, 1858
 Heliania Gray, 1860
 Junceella Valenciennes, 1855
 Nicella Gray, 1870
 Phenilia Gray, 1860
 Riisea Duchassaing & Michelotti, 1860
 Tenocella
 Verrucella Milne Edwards & Haime, 1857
 Viminella Gray, 1870

References

 
Cnidarian families
Taxa named by John Edward Gray
Calcaxonia